The Women's 4 × 400 metres relay at the 2014 Commonwealth Games, as part of the athletics programme, took place at Hampden Park on 1 and 2 August 2014.

Heats

Heat 1

Heat 2

Final

References

Women's 4 x 400 metres relay
2014
2014 in women's athletics